The Community Radio Awards are an accolade bestowed upon creatives in the community sector of broadcast radio in the United Kingdom. The awards showcase the work of community radio volunteers.

History 
The Community Radio Awards  were founded in 2016 by Martin Steers.

The 2016 awards ceremony was held in Birmingham 

The 2017 awards ceremony was held on 23 September in Bristol following a process involving over 350 entries in 16 categories from 70 community stations.

The 2018 ceremony was held on 15 September in Sheffield, with 360 entries considered from 77 stations in 18 categories. 

The 2019 ceremony was held in Barry, Wales in October, receiving more than 425 entries. 

Due to the COVID-19 pandemic, the 2020 ceremony was held online on December 7th, receiving 460 entries for consideration from 90 stations.

The 2021 ceremony was held on 23 October in Coventry following the inaugural national Community Radio Conference by the UK Community Radio Network

Nominations and Winners

2022 
Community Radio Awards 2022 winners:

2021 
Community Radio Awards 2021:

 Community Development Project of the Year
 Bronze Business Watch – Academy FM Thanet
 Silver A Space to Speak your Mind – SourceFM
 Gold The 4PS Radio Training School – Vectis Radio
 Station of the Year – Sponsored by PlayoutONE
 Bronze Sheppey FM
 Silver Heartland FM
 Gold Pride Radio
 Female Presenter of the Year
 Bronze Amelia Slaughter – Marlow FM
 Silver Katherine Liley – Heartland FM
 Gold Suzie "Sparkles" Stevens – LCR FM
 Male Presenter of the Year
 Bronze Ste Greenall – Black Cat Radio
 Silver Kev Lawrence – PCR103.2FM
 Gold Lewis Bowden – BFBS Catterick
 Community Show of the Year
 Bronze A Space to Speak your Mind – SourceFM
 Silver The Kev Lawrence Breakfast Show – PCR103.2FM
 Gold Christmas Day Radio Festival of Carols and Readings – Black Country Radio
 Live Event or Outside Broadcast of the Year – Sponsored by In:Quality
 Bronze Scottish Parliamentary Elections 2021 – Heartland FM
 Silver The Marlow Christmas Drive-In – Marlow FM
 Gold The Falmouth Remembrance Service – SourceFM
 Entertainment Show of the Year
 Bronze Lewis Bowden's Afternoon Show – BFBS Catterick
 Silver Natasha Reneaux Entertainment Show – BFBS Aldershot
 Gold Switch Radio's Christmas Crackers – Switch Radio
 Speech & Journalism of the Year – Sponsored by RadioToday
 Bronze One Voice Radio Series: Chinese life in Britain – allfm
 Silver Dad raises funds for MIND, in memory of his son – Black Cat Radio
 Gold Down on the Farm – Spark Sunderland
 Arts & Creative Radio of the Year – Sponsored by the Audio Content Fund
 Bronze Camelot – Chelmsford Community Radio
 Silver The Spooky Hour, by The Saturday Writers and Jonathan Pagden – Wycombe Sound
 Gold Beginning Of The End – Radio LaB 97.1FM
 Specialist Music Show of the Year
 Bronze Around the World – Lisburn’s 98FM
 Silver The Rock Shop with Michelle Livings – Marlow FM
 Gold Dance Revolution Chart of the Year 2020 – Spark Sunderland
 Sports Show of the Year
 Bronze K107 Saturday Sports Show – K107FM
 Silver Sports+ – Purbeck Coast FM
 Gold Daily Life with Rajani – Awaz FM
 Volunteer of the Year
 Bronze Kevin Ridgeon – Andover Radio
 Silver Andy Rankine – Drystone Radio
 Gold Nigel Dallard – Winchester Radio
 Young Person of the Year (under 25)
 Bronze Aimee Cordwell – Sheppey FM
 Silver Yanis Kerampran – Ipswich Community Radio
 Gold Lewis Allsopp – Erewash Sound
 Sage Person of the Year (over 60)
 Bronze Susie Mathis – Wythenshawe FM
 Silver Moz Walsh – allfm
 Gold Kelvin Currie – Vectis Radio
 Newcomer (new to radio in last 12 months) – Sponsored by The Radio Hub
 Bronze Flight Sergeant James Bruce – BFBS Brize Norton
 Silver Amelia Salmons – Erewash Sound
 Gold Ashleigh Kennan-Bryce – Heartland FM
 Innovation of the Year – Sponsored by Maxxwave
 Bronze A Space to Speak your Mind – SourceFM
 Silver Short Breaks in Lockdown – The 4Ps Radio Training School – Vectis Radio
 Gold 12 Communities One Bristol – BCfm Radio – Bristol Community FM
 Podcast of the Year
 Bronze 12 Communities One Bristol – BCfm Radio – Bristol Community FM
 Silver Rough Diamonds: True Colours – DWS AUDIO
 Gold The Alfred Daily Podcast – This is Alfred
 Digital or RSL Station of The Year
 Bronze Ocean Youth Radio
 Silver Petersfield's Shine Radio – Petersfield's Shine Radio
 Gold Radio Wanno – HMP Wandsworth – Radio Wanno – HMP Wandsworth
 Covid and Community Response
 Bronze Coronavirus Update – Gateway 97.8
 Silver Covid Response – BFBS Aldershot
 Gold Hidden Heroes, Marlow's Quiet Night In, and more – Marlow FM

2020
Community Radio Awards 2020:
 Community Development Project of the Year
 The #Lovebus – Andover Radio
 Occupy The Airwaves: 2020 – Phonic FM
 The Radio Plus Community Advent Calendar 2019 – Radio Plus
 A Space to Speak Your Mind – Source FM
 The Vectis Radio 4Ps Radio Training School – Vectis Radio
 Station of the Year
 Bro Radio
 Express FM
 Môn FM
 Pride Radio
 Raidió Fáilte
 Female Presenter of the Year
 Fiona McNeill – Dunoon Community Radio
 Gemma-Leigh James (Gemza) – Marlow FM
 Priya Matharu – Switch Radio
 Pippa Sawyer – Wycombe Sound
 Julie Donaldson – Zetland FM
 Male Presenter of the Year
 Luis Wyatt – Andover Radio
 Chris Kaye – BFBS Catterick
 Tom Lamb – Erewash Sound
 Lee Roe – Ribble FM
 Rob L'Esperance – Wycombe Sound
 Community Show of the Year
 Radio: Impact! – Cambridge 105 Radio
 VE Day Party – Gateway 97.8
 Trevor Blackman Now – Maritime Radio
 The For Women By Women Show – Vectis Radio
 The Vectis Radio 4Ps Training School Documentary – Vectis Radio
 Live Event or Outside Broadcast of the Year
 Virtual Strawberry Fair – Cambridge 105 Radio
 Memories Bus – Gateway 97.8
 Northern Pride Festival 2019 – Pride Radio
 Day trip for elderly people – Radio Verulam
 Surrey Fire And Rescue Service Open Day – Susy Radio
 Entertainment Show of the Year
 Coffee and Tea – Gateway 97.8
 Drive with Emma Millen – Spark
 Vibe Breakfast – Vibe 107.6 FM
 Morning Plus with Ollie Darvill – Erewash Sound
 Amelia Slaughter – Marlow FM
 Speech & Journalism of the Year
 When a community rallies round – after the radio station broke the story – Black Cat Radio
 Community rallies round as cemetery memorial is vandalised – Black Cat Radio
 Basildon Question Time – Gateway 97.8
 Meet The Smugglers – Radio LaB 97.1FM
 He's Just A Cleaner – Spark
 Arts & Creative Radio of the Year
 Virtual Strawberry Fair – Cambridge 105 Radio
 The Luncarty Lockdown – Heartland FM
 A Fete Worse Than Death – Somer Valley FM
 David Jay's Remembrance Sunday programme – Susy Radio
 Mulch – A Tale of Allotment Folk (Soap Opera) – Warminster Community Radio
 Specialist Music Show of the Year
 Country In My Veins – Ali Donowho – Alive Radio
 It's Showtime with Ryan & Jodana – Bro Radio
 Community Keyboards with Ian Wolstenholme – Oldham Community Radio
 The Vintage Show with Liz Catlow – Ribble FM
 Priya Matharu – Switch Radio
 Sports Show of the Year
 Richard Wyeth – Sports Show – BFBS Aldershot
 Bro Radio's Saturday Sport – Bro Radio
 NLive Sports Show – NLive Radio
 Verulam Sport – Radio Verulam
 Switch Radio Sport – Switch Radio
 Volunteer of the Year
 Kevin Rennie – Alive Radio
 Stephen Spencer – Ipswich Community Radio
 Alex Airnes – K107fm
 Steve Fox – Red Kite Radio
 Kelvin Currie – Vectis Radio
 Young Person of the Year (under 25)
 Luis Wyatt – Andover Radio
 Johnny Jenkins – Gateway 97.8
 Yanis Kerampran – Ipswich Community Radio
 Lucy Ashburner – Marlow FM
 Jake Hunter – Radio Ninesprings
 Sage Person (Over 60)
 Moz Walsh – ALLFM
 Liz Mullen – BFBS Colchester
 Tony Barnfield – Cambridge 105 Radio
 Rob Bayly – Somer Valley FM
 Paul Blitz – Winchester Radio
 Newcomer (new to radio in last 12 months)
 Claire Hamilton – Drystone Radio
 Angie B – Marlow FM
 Kate Walker – Red Kite Radio
 Isabel Ellis – Ribble FM
 Benjy Potter – Vibe 107.6 FM
 Innovation Award
 Live under lockdown! – Cambridge 105 Radio
 We created the board game, called 'Our Time and Place…Halifax' – Phoenix Fm
 COBS – A Complete Outside Broadcast System – Radio Verulam
 Switch Radio's News Hub – Switch Radio
 The Vectis Radio 4ps Vectis Radio Training School – Vectis Radio
 Podcast
 RAINBOW DADS – Stories of Gay and Bi Dads – Chelmsford Community Radio
 Primrose and Terry: in the shed – Radio LaB 97.1FM
 FEM2020 – Spark
 LockDown Reflections – Ujima Radio
 Kids in Quarantine Podcast – Chelmsford Community Radio
 Digital or RSL Station Of The Year
 Maidstone Radio
 Ocean Youth
 Radio Ysbyty Gwynedd
 Riverside Radio
 Swansbrook Radio
 Special Coverage: 2019 General Elections Coverage
 Election Coverage 2019 #BrumVotes – Switch Radio
 All Out Election – Gateway 97.8
 The South West Wiltshire Interviews – Warminster Community Radio
 General Election Coverage – Wycombe Sound
 General Election Hustings – Bro Radio

2019

 Podcast of the Year
 Gold: Rich Seams – New Writing North
 Silver: ArtsWatch – Riverside Radio
 Bronze: Speak Up Sunderland – Solo Arts CIC
 Innovation of the Year
 Gold: Pride Community Network – Pride Radio
 Silver: Not so much a website, more a community hub – Radio Verulam
 Bronze The Local Radio Marketing Group – Wycombe Sound
 Newcomer of the Year (new to radio in last 12 months)
 Gold: Jenna Myles – FromeFM
 Silver: Sam Sethi – Marlow FM
 Bronze Lewis Allsopp – Erewash Sound
 Sage Person (Over 60)
 Gold: Geoff Selby – Bro Radio
 Silver: Kelvin Currie – Vectis Radio
 Bronze Sue Rodwell Smith – HCR FM
 Young Person of the Year (under 25)
 Gold: Emma Snow – Erewash Sound
 Silver: Kane McMahon – Bro Radio
 Bronze Haashim Siddique – Asian Star Radio, Slough
 Volunteer of the Year
 Gold: Kate Gregory – Speysound Radio
 Silver: Chas Large – Red Kite Radio
 Bronze Luke Davis – Wycombe Sound 106.6fm
 Sports Show of the Year
 Gold: MônFM Sport – MônFM
 Silver: Verulam Sports – Radio Verulam
 Bronze The Terrace Radio Show – Radio Cardiff
 Specialist Music Show of the Year
 Gold: The Roots Collective – Wycombe Sound
 Silver: It’s Showtime with Ryan & Jodana – Bro Radio
 Bronze Alex Krupa's Country Show – Andover Radio
 Arts & Creative Radio of the Year
 Gold: Maritime Radio Launch: A Love Song to Greenwich & Woolwich – Maritime Radio
 Silver: Where I Was Born, Where I Was Raised – Spark Sunderland
 Bronze "The UK's most creative independent radio station" – Resonance FM
 Speech & Journalism of the Year
 Gold: Autism & It's Possibilities – Radio LaB 97.1FM
 Silver: Talking Men – The Alex Skeel Interview – Cambridge 105 Radio
 Bronze Second Chance: Disclosing Your Past – Swindon 105.5
 Entertainment Show of the Year
 Gold: Desi Beats Show with Desi Diva Deepa – Asian Star Radio
 Silver: Robbie James – Express FM
 Bronze The Dylan Taylor Breakfast Show – 107 Endeavour FM
 Live Event or Outside Broadcast of the Year
 Gold: Source FM Christmas Party 2018 – Source FM
 Silver: Source FM's Parklive – Source FM
 Bronze Start of the Great North Run 2018 – Radio Tyneside
 Female Presenter of the Year
 Gold: Jo Thoenes – BFBS Brize Norton
 Silver: Gemma-Leigh James – Marlow FM
 Bronze Fiona McNeill – Dunoon Community Radio
 Male Presenter of the Year
 Gold: Sam Day – Future Radio
 Silver: Rob L'Esperance – Wycombe Sound 106.6fm
 Bronze Chris Kaye – BFBS Catterick
 Community Show of the Year
 Gold: Julie Donaldson's Morning Mix – Zetland FM
 Silver: The Health and Wellbeing Hour – Heartland FM
 Bronze The Vale This Week – Bro Radio
 Community Development Project of the Year
 Gold: Chapel St Primary School takes over – ALL FM
 Silver: Cash 4 Calendars Campaign – Spark Sunderland
 Bronze The 4Ps Project – Vectis Radio
 Digital or RSL Station Of The Year
 Gold: Radio Wanno
 Silver: Ocean Youth Radio
 Bronze Thre3-6ix Radio & Scout Radio
 Station of the Year
 Gold: ALL FM
 Silver: Wycombe Sound
 Bronze Spark Sunderland

2018

 Station of the Year
 Gold: Raidió Fáilte
 Silver: Spark Sunderland
 Bronze: ALL FM
 Community Development Project of the Year
 Gold: The METS Training programme - Somer Valley FM
 Silver: Mental Health Community Project - Sheppey FM
 Bronze: The 4Ps Project - Vectis Radio
 Female Presenter of the Year
 Gold: Julie Donaldson - Zetland FM
 Silver: Philippa Sawyer - Wycombe Sound
 Bronze: Emma Snow - Erewash Sound
 Male Presenter of the Year
 Gold: Mark Jarvis - Erewash Sound
 Silver: Rob L’Esperance - Wycombe Sound
 Bronze: Simon Wilson - Voice FM
 Community Show of the Year
 Gold: Pol.ON – The Polish Show - East Coast FM
 Silver: Tameside Today - Tameside Radio
 Bronze: The One Love Breakfast Show - BCfm
 Live Event or Outside Broadcast of the Year
 Gold: Local Radio Day 2018 - Wycombe Sound
 Silver: General Election 2017 - Chelmsford Community Radio
 Bronze: ‘Spirit of Wildfire’ – A Festival for Radio - 107 Meridian FM
 Entertainment Show of the Year
 Gold: The Rob L’Esperance Jukebox - Wycombe Sound
 Silver: Emma Snow - Erewash Sound
 Gold: Drivetime with Ryan and Beth - Spark Sunderland
 Speech and Journalism of the Year
 Gold: The Parents’ Show - Radio Verulam
 Silver: Opening of the Herne Centre - Radio Cabin
 Bronze: Dear Reader with Jessica Stone - CSR
 Sports Show of the Year
 Gold: Tuesday Night Sport - Wycombe Sound
 Silver: OB's Saturday Sport Show - Radio Cardiff
 Bronze: Live Commentary – FA Cup – Birmingham Senior Cup - Black Country Radio
 Volunteer of the Year
 Gold: Oliver Downing - KCC Live
 Silver: Oliver Wilkinson - Drystone Radio
 Bronze: Alex Farrell - Radio Tamworth
 Young Person of the Year
 Gold: Jeannie Nicolas - Erewash Sound
 Silver: Liam Gates - Wycombe Sound
 Bronze: James O’Malley - Tameside Radio
 Sage Person of the Year
 Gold: Chris Moore - Endeavour FM
 Silver: Roz Johnson - Wythenshawe Community Radio
 Bronze: Bill Prentice - Black Diamond FM
 Newcomer of the Year
 Gold: Jane Steele - Drystone Radio
 Silver: Abbie Clive - Sheppey FM
 Bronze: Mimi Harker OBE - Wycombe Sound
 Innovation of the Year
 Gold: ‘Get On’ - Science Education & Community Radio - Academy FM Folkestone
 Silver: Halifax The Halifax Jigsaw Project - Phoenix FM
 Bronze: The Chorley FM ‘100 Club’ - Chorley FM
 Podcast of the Year
 Gold: National Prison Radio Double Bubble
 Digital/RSL Station of the Year
 Gold: Wandsworth Radio

2017

 Station of the Year
 ALL FM
 Raidió Fáilte
 Ribble FM
 Somer Valley FM
 Wycombe Sound 106.6FM
 Community Development Project of the Year
 Radio Sheung Lok – ALL FM
 Mackem Craic – Spark FM
 A Present from the Past – Phoenix FM Halifax
 Alright Mate I’m Listening (Male Mental Health Project) – Ribble FM
 Global Sunderland – Spark FM
 Female Presenter of the Year
 Laura Perry – CSRfm
 Fiona Jessica Wilson (aka FJ) – Ipswich Community Radio
 Louise Croombs – Tameside Radio
 Philippa Sawyer – Wycombe Sound 106.6FM
 Julie Donaldson – Zetland FM
 Male Presenter of the Year
 Mark Jarvis – Erewash Sound
 Rory Auskerry – Pure 107.8FM
 Lee Roe – Ribble FM
 Mark Blackman – Wirral Radio
 Rob L’Esperance – Wycombe Sound 106.6FM
 Community Show of the Year
 The Midweek Sportsbar – BCFM Radio
 Summer Saturday – Cambridge 105
 Kinlochlovin Drivetime – Nevis Radio
 Farming Friday – Ribble FM
 Mid-Morning – Wycombe Sound 106.6FM
 Live Event or Outside Broadcast of the Year
 Les James Challenge Cup Final 2017 – 107.5 Switch Radio
 BCfm Election night 2017 – 1BCfm Radio
 Tour de Yorkshire – Drystone Radio
 Failsworth Carnival – Oldham Community Radio 99.7fm
 Radio Verulam brings LIVE FA Cup coverage to St Albans – Radio Verulam
 Entertainment Show of the Year
 Old Gits and Hits – BCFM Bristol
 The Kieran Poole Sessions – Miskin Radio
 The Week in Geek – The biggest Geek radio show in the UK – Spark FM
 Drivetime with Ryan and Beth – Spark FM
 Breakfast with Louise – Tameside Radio
 Speech and Journalism Radio of the Year
 Sapana Budha ‘Nepal: after the Earthquake’ – Radio LaB 97.1FM
 Newsburst – Sheppey FM 92.2
 Spark Reports – Spark FM
 Rough Sleep – Tameside Radio
 The Late Show with Joe Shennan – Wycombe Sound 106.6FM
 Arts and Creative Radio of the Year
 Folkestone Life, A Sound Art Project – Academy FM (Folkestone)
 Dear Reader – CSRfm
 Huntsford – Huntingdon Community Radio (HCR104fm)
 Lincoln Voices – Lincoln City Radio
 The Second Coming – Warminster Community Radio
 Specialist Music Show of the Year
 The Urban LP – CSRfm
 The Vintage Show – Ribble FM
 The Richard Harris Folk and Blues Show – Somer Valley FM
 Dance Revolution – Spark FM
 Showstoppers – Zetland FM
 Sports Show of the Year
 The Wycombe Sound Saturday Sports Show – Wycombe Sound 106.6FM
 The Saturday Scoreboard – Switch Radio
 Sportsbyte – Spark FM
 Radio Verulam FA Cup coverage St Albans v Carlisle United – Radio Verulam
 OB’s Saturday Sport Show – Radio Cardiff
 Volunteer of the Year
 Ian Robertson – East Coast fm
 John Weller – Nevis Radio
 Arthur Chorley – Oldham Community Radio 99.7fm
 Gary Tottingham – Radio LaB
 Jack Bee – Sheppey 92.2 FM
 Young Person of the Year
 Lila Bellamy – 107 Meridian FM
 Jake Peach – CSRfm
 Mark Jarvis – Erewash Sound
 Rachel Price – Forces Radio BFBS Northern Ireland
 Lewis Baxter – Ribble FM
 Sage Person of the Year
 Hugh Taylor – Alive Radio
 Manjulika Singh – Awaz FM
 Trish Napier – Canalside Radio
 Harry Haward – Resonance FM
 Keith Green – Warminster Community Radio
 Newcomer of the Year
 Katy Ashman – Abbey 104
 Samantha Howard – Academy FM Folkestone
 Mark Jarvis – Erewash Sound
 Emma Snow – Erewash Sound
 Lee Roe – Ribble FM
 Innovation Award
 The One Pound SoundHound Round – East Coast 107.6FM
 300 Club Lottery – Oldham Community Radio 99.7fm
 Building an Audience using Facebook Live – Spark FM
 Mackem Craic – Spark FM
 Raspberry Pi Uplink Solution – Wycombe Sound 106.6FM
 Podcast
 Apex – Cam FM
 Talking Men – Cambridge 105
 Fair Frome Food Bank training podcast – Frome FM
 Shadow – Insanity Radio
 Radio Wanno – Radio Wanno (HMP Wandsworth)

2016

 Station of the Year: Ujima Radio
 Female Presenter of the Year: Primrose Granville - Ujima Radio
 Male Presenter of the Year: Ben Ellis - Switch Radio

Honours 
In 2021 the awards launched an Honours programme to honour those who have provided outstanding or exceptional service to Community Radio. 

Those who have received honours are:

Audrey Hall for her decades of presenting and producing radio, and for community activity in support of and to increase representation of the black community in Greater Manchester, with most recently being part of the team at AllFM.

Danny Lawrence for his 20 plus years’ service to community radio, at various stations across the country, including the last 15 years at Gateway 97.8, for his services representing and supporting the sector with roles at the CMA, for founding the Radio Hub, and also in the last year supporting stations to give out thousands of free radios to those lonely and isolated.

Graham Laycock for over 50 years of exceptional commitment to Community radio and his outstanding dedication to Brooklands Radio and the volunteers within it.

Nathan Spackman for his significant impact in the development of Bro Radio in Wales, especially illustrated by the station winning station of the year at last year’s awards, but also his continued work at developing and representing the sector, locally in Wales as the founding co chair of the Welsh community radio network and co-founder of the UK Community Radio Network

Soo Williams for her work at Ofcom being instrumental in facilitating the creation of community radio in its current form, and for overseeing its implementation until her retirement last year.

Tony Smith for his hard work and dedication over the last 20 plus years launching and running Angel Radio, who support an underserved older audience.

References

External links

Awards established in 2016
Annual events in the United Kingdom
British radio awards
Radio organisations in the United Kingdom